Chisato Station (千里駅) is the name of two train stations in Japan:

 Chisato Station (Mie)
 Chisato Station (Toyama)